Crown Street Station was a passenger railway terminal station on Crown Street, Liverpool, England. The station was the world's first intercity passenger station, opening in 1830, also being the railway terminal station for Liverpool. Used for passengers for only six years, the station was demolished as the site was converted into a goods yard. The goods yard remained in use until 1972. The location of the station is now a park with little trace of the station or goods yard.

History
The station opened on 15 September 1830 as the Liverpool passenger terminus of the Liverpool and Manchester Railway, the world's first public passenger line. This gave the station the  distinction of being the world's first dedicated intercity passenger railway station as the first train ran from Liverpool. Manchester's corresponding Liverpool Road terminus station opened on the same day, being the destination of the first train from Liverpool.

The architecture is attributed to George Stephenson. Together with the adjacent  Wapping Tunnel, these were the first tunnels to be bored under a metropolis. Stationary steam engines, located in the cutting, operated a continuous rope system to haul wagons up inclines from Edge Hill station and up the Wapping Tunnel from Park Lane Goods Depot, earlier known as Wapping railway goods station, at Liverpool's south end docks. The Wapping Tunnel runs under the Crown Street station site.

Crown Street station was too far from Liverpool city centre. Its use as a passenger station ended after only six years of use in 1836 when Lime Street Station was opened. The site of the Crown Street station was converted to a goods yard. An additional twin track tunnel was built from the Edge Hill cutting in 1846 to improve throughput to the goods yard.  The goods yard closed permanently when services through the two tunnels ended in 1972. The Wapping Tunnel along with the original Crown Street tunnel also ceased operation in 1972.

Millfield
Immediately to the south of Crown Street station was an area known as Millfield or Gray's yard. This included a large marshalling and storage area as well as a substantial works involved in the construction and maintenance of wagons and carriages.

Current use of the site
The area has been landscaped as a park with the original 1830 single track tunnel's western portal covered over.  The 1846 Crown Street tunnel is now used as a headshunt for trains. Student accommodation for the nearby University of Liverpool has been built on a part of the old goods yard site. The site of the station itself is landscaped. The Wapping Tunnel's ventilation tower and a plaque commemorate the station's place in history. There are also a small number of stone sleeper blocks close to the fence on Falkner Street.

Potential new station
The proposal for Paddington Village mentions that a station in the 2014 Liverpool City Region, (LCR) Long Term Rail Strategy would be of use, the station would be on the Wapping Tunnel. However, the Paddington Village Spatial Regeneration Framework document of October 2016, page 36, specifically gives a map with a station on the old Crown Street station site, stating the locations as Crown Street/Myrtle Street.

Sources 
 
 http://www.spartacus-educational.com/RAliverpoolST.htm
 http://www.subbrit.org.uk/sb-sites/sites/l/liverpool_edge_hill_cutting/index.shtml

References

Disused railway stations in Liverpool
Former London and North Western Railway stations
Railway stations in Great Britain opened in 1830
Railway stations in Great Britain closed in 1836
Edge Hill, Liverpool
1830 establishments in England